This is a list of the flora of the Tubuai, an island in French Polynesia.

 Acalypha raivavensis
 Acrostichum aureum
 Adiantum hispidulum
 Allophylus rhomboidalis
 Alyxia stellata
 Amphineuron opulentum
 Angiopteris evecta
 Antrophyum plantagineum
 Arachniodes aristata
 Asplenium australasicum
 Asplenium caudatum
 Asplenium gibberosum
 Asplenium horridum
 Asplenium indusiatum
 Asplenium laserpitiifolium
 Asplenium nidus
 Asplenium obtusatum
 Asplenium quaylei var. rapense
 Barringtonia asiatica
 Belvisia mucronata
 Blechnum capense
 Blechnum norfolkianum
 Blechnum orientale
 Blechnum vulcanicum
 Boerhavia acutifolia
 Boerhavia tetrandra
 Bolbitis lonchophora
 Bulbophyllum longiflorum
 Caesalpinia major
 Calanthe triplicata
 Calophyllum inophyllum
 Canavalia rosea
 Canavalia sericea
 Cassytha filiformis
 Celtis pacifica
 Cerbera manghas
 Charpentiera australis
 Christella parasitica
 Cladium jamaicense
 Cocculus orbiculatus
 Cocos nucifera
 Colubrina asiatica
 Coprosma velutina
 Cordia subcordata
 Ctenitis sciaphila var. raivavensis
 Cyathea medullaris
 Cyclophyllum barbatum
 Cyclosorus interruptus
 Davallia solida
 Dendrobium involutum
 Dianella intermedia
 Dicranopteris linearis
 Dioclea wilsonii
 Diplazium harpeodes
 Dodonaea viscosa
 Doodia media
 Doryopteris concolor
 Elaeocarpus tonganus
 Elaphoglossum tahitesne
 Entada phaseoloides
 Eria rostriflora
 Eugenia reinwardtiana
 Fagraea berteroana
 Ficinia nodosa
 Fimbristylis cymosa subsp. umbello-capitata
 Fimbristylis dichotoma
 Glochidion raivavense
 Guettarda speciosa
 Haloragis sp.
 Haplopteris elongata
 Hedyotis romanzoffiensis
 Heliotropium anomalum
 Hernandia moehrenhoutiana subsp. samoensis
 Hernandia nymphaeifolia
 Hernandia ovigera subsp. stokesii
 Hibiscus australensis
 Hibiscus tiliaceus
 Histiopteris incisa
 Homalium sp.
 Huperzia phlegmaria
 Huperzia squarrosa
 Hymenophyllum diversilabium
 Hymenophyllum polyanthos
 Hypolepis tenuifolia
 Ipomoea indica
 Ipomoea littoralis
 Ipomoea macrantha
 Ipomoea pes-caprae subsp. brasiliensis
 Ixora brevipedunculata
 Jasminum didymum
 Korthalsella platycaula
 Lepidium bidentatum
 Lepturus repens
 Liparis clypeolum
 Liparis revoluta
 Lomariopsis brackenridgei
 Lycopodiella cernua
 Lygodium reticulatum
 Macropiper latifolium
 Malaxis resupinata
 Maytenus vitiensis
 Meryta brachypoda
 Metrosideros collina
 Metrosideros collina var. villosa
 Microsorum commutatum
 Microsorum grossum
 Microtatorchis paife
 Millettia sp.
 Mucuna gigantea
 Myrsine andersonii
 Myrsine brownii
 Nephrolepis biserrata
 Nephrolepis cordifolia
 Nephrolepis hirsutula
 Nervilia aragoana
 Oberonia equitans
 Ophioglossum pendulum
 Pandanus tectorius
 Pandanus tectorius var. tubuaiensis
 Paspalum distichum
 Peperomia australana
 Peperomia blanda var. floribunda
 Peperomia pallida
 Peperomia rapensis
 Pipturus australium
 Pisonia amplifolia
 Pisonia coronata
 Pisonia grandis
 Plectranthus parviflorus
 Polystichum australium
 Portulaca lutea
 Pouteria grayana
 Premna serratifolia
 Procris pedunculata
 Psilotum nudum
 Psychotria tubuaiensis
 Pteris comans
 Pteris tripartita
 Ptisana salicina
 Pyrrosia serpens
 Reediella endlicheriana
 Reediella humilis
 Rhus taitensis
 Scaevola taccada
 Schleinitzia insularum
 Schoenoplectus littoralis subsp. subulatus
 Selenodesmium dentatum
 Serianthes rurutensis
 Sophora tomentosa
 Sphaerostephanos invisus
 Sphenomeris chinensis
 Stictocardia campanulata
 Suriana maritima
 Taeniophyllum fasciola
 Tarenna sambucina
 Tectaria papillosa
 Teratophyllum wilkesianum
 Terminalia glabrata var. haroldii
 Thespesia populnea
 Tournefortia argentea
 Trema discolor
 Triumfetta procumbens
 Tuberolabium papuanum
 Uncinia uncinata
 Wikstroemia coriacea
 Xylosma suaveolens subsp. gracile

References
 http://www.polynesien.minks-lang.de/a.pol.englisch/pol1.ins.s-z/tubuai.tubuai1.html

 
Lists of plants